WQTS (102.9 FM) is a radio station broadcasting a southern gospel format from The Life FM network. Licensed to Statesboro, Georgia, United States, the station is currently owned by The Power Foundation.

History
The station went on the air as WUUF on 1988-03-24. On 1995-08-06, the station changed its call sign to WPMX.

WPMX swapped call signs with sister station WHKN on August 9, 2018, and then changed call signs again on August 28, 2018, to the current WQTS. This came after Neal Ardman, owner of Radio Statesboro, Inc., sold the facility to the Power Foundation, owner of The Life FM, for $150,000.

References

External links

1996 establishments in Georgia (U.S. state)
Radio stations established in 1996
QTS
Southern Gospel radio stations in the United States